Untersteckholz was a municipality in the district of Aarwangen in the canton of Bern in Switzerland.  On 1 January 2010, Untersteckholz merged into Langenthal.

Geography
Of this area,  or 73.9% is used for agricultural purposes, while  or 20.8% is forested. Of the rest of the land,  or 5.7% is settled (buildings or roads).

Of the built up area, housing and buildings made up 2.1% and transportation infrastructure made up 3.2%.  17.7% of the total land area is heavily forested and 3.2% is covered with orchards or small clusters of trees.  Of the agricultural land, 56.5% is used for growing crops and 14.1% is pastures, while 3.2% is used for orchards or vine crops.

Demographics
, 1.2% of the population was made up of foreign nationals. Over the last 10 years the population has grown at a rate of 5.8%. Most of the population speaks German  (97.6%), with Rhaeto-romance being second most common ( 0.6%) and Russian being third ( 0.6%).

In the 2007 election the most popular party was the SVP which received 65.3% of the vote.  The next three most popular parties were the FDP (11.3%), the Green Party (11.1%) and the local small left-wing parties (5.9%).

The age distribution of the population is children and teenagers (0–19 years old) make up 18.6% of the population, while adults (20–64 years old) make up 61.7% and the seniors (over 64 years old) make up 19.8%.  In Untersteckholz about 79.7% of the population (between age 25-64) have completed either non-mandatory upper secondary education or additional higher education (either University or a Fachhochschule).

Untersteckholz has an unemployment rate of 0.17%.  , there were 58 people employed in the primary economic sector and about 14 businesses involved in this sector.  16 people are employed in the secondary sector and there are 5 businesses in this sector.  11 people are employed in the tertiary sector, with 2 businesses in this sector.

References

Former municipalities of the canton of Bern
Populated places disestablished in 2010